Micromyrtus is a genus of shrubs, in the family Myrtaceae, described as a genus in 1865. The entire genus is endemic to Australia.

Species
The following is a list of species accepted by the Australian Plant Census as at March 2020:  

 Micromyrtus acuta Rye
 Micromyrtus albicans A.R.Bean 
 Micromyrtus arenicola Rye
 Micromyrtus barbata J.W.Green 
 Micromyrtus blakelyi J.W.Green
 Micromyrtus capricornia A.R.Bean
 Micromyrtus carinata A.R. Bean
 Micromyrtus chrysodema Rye
 Micromyrtus ciliata (Sm.) Druce - fringed heath-myrtle
 Micromyrtus clavata  J.W.Green ex Rye
 Micromyrtus collina Rye 
 Micromyrtus delicata A.R.Bean 
 Micromyrtus elobata (F.Muell.) Benth.
 Micromyrtus elobata (F.Muell.) Benth. subsp. elobata
 Micromyrtus elobata subsp. scopula Rye
 Micromyrtus erichsenii Hemsl. 
 Micromyrtus fimbrisepala J.W.Green
 Micromyrtus flaviflora (F.Muell.) J.M.Black 
 Micromyrtus forsteri A.R.Bean 
 Micromyrtus gracilis A.R.Bean 
 Micromyrtus grandis J.T.Hunter 
 Micromyrtus greeniana Rye
 Micromyrtus helmsii (F.Muell. & Tate) J.W.Green 
 Micromyrtus hexamera (Maiden & Betche) Maiden & Betche 
 Micromyrtus hymenonema (F.Muell.) C.A.Gardner 
 Micromyrtus imbricata Benth. 
 Micromyrtus leptocalyx (F.Muell.) Benth.  
 Micromyrtus littoralis A.R.Bean 
 Micromyrtus minutiflora Benth. 
 Micromyrtus monotaxis Rye
 Micromyrtus mucronulata Rye
 Micromyrtus navicularis Rye
 Micromyrtus ninghanensis Rye 
 Micromyrtus obovata (Turcz.) J.W.Green
 Micromyrtus papillosa J.W.Green ex Rye
 Micromyrtus patula A.R.Bean 
 Micromyrtus placoides Rye
 Micromyrtus prochytes Rye
 Micromyrtus racemosa Benth. 
 Micromyrtus redita Rye
 Micromyrtus rogeri J.W.Green ex Rye 
 Micromyrtus rotundifolia A.R.Bean 
 Micromyrtus rubicalyx Rye
 Micromyrtus serrulata J.W.Green 
 Micromyrtus sessilis J.W.Green  
 Micromyrtus stenocalyx (F.Muell.) J.W.Green 
 Micromyrtus striata J.W.Green  
 Micromyrtus sulphurea W.Fitzg.  
 Micromyrtus triptycha Rye
 Micromyrtus trudgenii Rye
 Micromyrtus uniovulum Rye
 Micromyrtus vernicosa A.R.Bean

References

Australian Plant Name Index, IBIS database, Centre for Plant Biodiversity Research, Australian Government, Canberra: Micromyrtus
PlantNET - New South Wales Flora Online (PlantNET): Genus Micromyrtus
Australian Native Plants Society (Australia): Micromyrtus blakelyi

 
Myrtaceae genera
Myrtales of Australia
Taxa named by George Bentham
Endemic flora of Australia